College Avenue may refer to:
 College Avenue station, the former name of Medford/Tufts station in Medford, Massachusetts
 College Avenue station (Illinois), in Wheaton, Illinois
 College Avenue Campus, the oldest campus of Rutgers University–New Brunswick in New Brunswick, New Jersey
 College Avenue Gymnasium, at Rutgers University
 College Avenue Historic District (disambiguation)
 College Avenue Secondary School, in Woodstock, Ontario, Canada
 Pennsylvania Route 26, which runs on College Avenue in State College, Pennsylvania, United States